William Hickling Prescott House, also known as the Headquarters House, is an historic house museum located at 55 Beacon Street on Beacon Hill in Boston, Massachusetts. It is the left-hand portion of a double townhouse at 54–55 Beacon Street, seen in the photograph. The townhouse, built in 1808 to a design by Asher Benjamin, was designated a National Historic Landmark in 1964 for its association with William Hickling Prescott (1796–1859), one of the nation's first historians. The house is now a museum operated by the Massachusetts chapter of the National Society of the Colonial Dames of America, which purchased it for its headquarters in 1944.

Description and history
Built in 1808, the twin houses were designed by architect Asher Benjamin. Still nearly mirror images of one another, they are four stories in height and three bays wide. The outer two bays of each unit are part of a rounded bay front, delineated by pilasters rising from the top of the first story porch to the roof. The porch is supported by a Doric colonnade, and follows the line of the rounded bays. The doorways are in the innermost bays, flanked by sidelight windows and topped by a fanlight.

The left side, 55 Beacon Street is named for William Hickling Prescott, a nearly blind historian from a prominent Boston family, who lived there from 1845 to 1859. Prescott had celebrated novelist William Makepeace Thackeray as a houseguest. That unit was acquired in 1944 by the Massachusetts chapter of the National Society of the Colonial Dames of America for use as its headquarters, a role it still serves. The Dames restored Prescott's study to its original state in 1968, based on historical documents.

The houses' original owner was James Smith Colburn, a successful Boston merchant. He commissioned Asher Benjamin to build the double town houses on land he purchased from the Mount Vernon Proprietors. Originally, the structures were free-standing and would have had a water view (before the filling of the area that is now the Boston Public Garden). They were the height of fashion in the Early Republic. Prescott purchased his house in 1845 and after his death, his wife sold it to cousins, the Dexters. They made significant changes to the house: updating the stairwell, adding an elevator and reconfiguring Prescott's library into a dining room.

The house was designated a U.S. National Historic Landmark in 1964, and was listed on National Register of Historic Places in 1966, for its association with Prescott, who gained a reputation for his books on Spanish (and Spanish colonial) history. His 1837 History of the Conquest of Mexico received great acclaim both in the United States and in Europe. Due to his blindness (caused by an incident during a bar brawl), he employed researchers and secretaries to acquire documents and prepare his manuscripts.

One of the two units (possibly both) is memorialized as a Victorian dollhouse at the Cayuga Art Museum in Auburn, New York.

See also
 List of National Historic Landmarks in Massachusetts
 National Register of Historic Places listings in northern Boston, Massachusetts

References

External links

 William Hickling Prescott House – National Society of the Colonial Dames of America

Houses completed in 1808
Asher Benjamin buildings
Houses in Boston
National Historic Landmarks in Boston
Beacon Hill, Boston
Museums in Boston
Historic house museums in Massachusetts
Literary museums in the United States
Historic district contributing properties in Massachusetts
National Society of the Colonial Dames of America
Houses on the National Register of Historic Places in Suffolk County, Massachusetts
National Register of Historic Places in Boston
Homes of American writers